{{DISPLAYTITLE:N-Methyl-D-aspartic acid}}

N-methyl--aspartic acid or N-methyl--aspartate (NMDA) is an amino acid derivative that acts as a specific agonist at the NMDA receptor mimicking the action of glutamate, the neurotransmitter which normally acts at that receptor. Unlike glutamate, NMDA only binds to and regulates the NMDA receptor and has no effect on other glutamate receptors (such as those for AMPA and kainate).  NMDA receptors are particularly important when they become overactive during, for example, withdrawal from alcohol as this causes symptoms such as agitation and, sometimes, epileptiform seizures.

Biological function
In 1962, J.C. Watkins reported synthesizing NMDA, an isomer of the previously known N-Methyl--aspartic-acid (PubChem ID 4376). NMDA is a water-soluble -alpha-amino acid — an aspartic acid derivative with an N-methyl substituent and -configuration — found across Animalia from lancelets to mammals. At homeostatic levels NMDA plays an essential role as a neurotransmitter and neuroendocrine regulator. At increased but sub–toxic levels NMDA becomes neuro-protective.  In excessive amounts NMDA is an excitotoxin. Behavioral neuroscience research utilizes NMDA excitotoxicity to induce lesions in specific regions of an animal subject's brain or spinal cord to study behavioral changes.

The mechanism of action for the NMDA receptor is a specific agonist binding to its NR2 subunits, and then a non-specific cation channel is opened, which can allow the passage of Ca2+ and Na+ into the cell and K+ out of the cell. Therefore, NMDA receptors will only open if glutamate is in the synapse and concurrently the postsynaptic membrane is already depolarized - acting as coincidence detectors at the neuronal level. The excitatory postsynaptic potential (EPSP) produced by activation of an NMDA receptor also increases the concentration of Ca2+ in the cell. The Ca2+ can in turn function as a second messenger in various signaling pathways. This process is modulated by a number of endogenous and exogenous compounds and plays a key role in a wide range of physiological (such as memory) and pathological processes (such as excitotoxicity).

Antagonists

Examples of antagonists, or more appropriately named receptor channel blockers, of the NMDA receptor are APV, amantadine, dextromethorphan (DXM), ketamine, magnesium, tiletamine, phencyclidine (PCP), riluzole, memantine, methoxetamine (MXE), methoxphenidine (MXP) and kynurenic acid. While dizocilpine is generally considered to be the prototypical NMDA receptor blocker and is the most common agent used in research, animal studies have demonstrated some amount of neurotoxicity, which may or may not also occur in humans. These compounds are commonly referred to as NMDA receptor antagonists.

See also
 Anti-NMDA-receptor encephalitis

References

Further reading

 
 

Neurotransmitters
Dicarboxylic acids
Amino acid derivatives
Glutamate (neurotransmitter)
Secondary amino acids